KNAF-FM (105.7 FM) is an American radio station broadcasting a country music format and licensed to the Fredericksburg, Texas area. It is owned by J. & J. Fritz Media, Ltd.

The station was assigned the call letters KNAF-FM on August 26, 1996.  On December 10, 2003, the station changed its call sign to just KNAF. 
On December 24, 2003, the station was sold.

The station has no live on-air DJs during the broadcast day, except for the morning show.

References

External links
 The Deuce 105.7 Facebook
 

Country radio stations in the United States
NAF-FM
Radio stations established in 1996